Windham Lawrence Rotunda (born May 23, 1987) is an American professional wrestler. He is currently signed to WWE, where he performs on the SmackDown brand under the ring name Bray Wyatt. 

Rotunda is a third-generation professional wrestler, following in the footsteps of his grandfather Blackjack Mulligan, his father Mike Rotunda, and two of his uncles – Barry and Kendall Windham. His younger brother Taylor Rotunda is also a professional wrestler, best known as Bo Dallas. Alongside his brother, he held the FCW Florida Tag Team Championship twice while in WWE's then-developmental territory Florida Championship Wrestling (FCW), where he wrestled under various ring names between 2008 and 2012. He briefly wrestled on WWE's main roster from 2010 to 2011 under the ring name Husky Harris, most notably as a member of The Nexus.

After returning to WWE's developmental territory, which had been rebranded as NXT, Rotunda was repackaged as Bray Wyatt. Portrayed as the villainous leader of The Wyatt Family, a bayou-dwelling cult, he returned to the main roster alongside Wyatt Family members Luke Harper and Erick Rowan in 2013. He subsequently became a three-time world champion in WWE, holding the WWE Championship once and the Universal Championship twice. He also held the SmackDown Tag Team Championship (with Harper and Randy Orton under the Freebird rule) and the Raw Tag Team Championship (with Matt Hardy) once each. 

After a hiatus from August 2018 to April 2019, Wyatt returned with a new gimmick. Portrayed as suffering from a transformative multiple personality disorder, he randomly switched back and forth between two characters: his "good side" of Bray Wyatt, a Mr. Rogers-esque children's TV host, and his bad side of The Fiend, a grotesque horror-themed monster clown. He was released from WWE in July 2021 and returned at Extreme Rules in October 2022, now with a character that claimed to be his "real-life" self but gradually re-incorporated his multiple personalities in addition to some new ones.

Early life 
Windham Lawrence Rotunda was born in Brooksville, Florida, on May 23, 1987. He graduated in 2005. He also played football as a defensive tackle and guard. Rotunda played at the College of the Sequoias for two seasons, earning second-team All-American honors as a sophomore offensive guard. He earned a football scholarship to Troy University, where he played collegiate football for two years. He left Troy 27 credit hours short of earning a bachelor's degree after deciding to become a professional wrestler.

Professional wrestling career

World Wrestling Entertainment / WWE

Developmental territories (2009–2010) 
He made his in-ring debut in dark match on the February 5, 2009 episode of Florida Championship Wrestling (FCW), defeating Brian Jossie. Rotunda made his television debut in April 2009, using the name Alex Rotundo. He later changed his name to Duke Rotundo. In June 2009, he began teaming with his brother Bo. At the FCW television tapings on July 23, The Rotundo Brothers defeated The Dude Busters (Caylen Croft and Trent Barretta) to become the #1 contenders to the FCW Florida Tag Team Championship. That same night, they defeated Justin Angel and Kris Logan for the FCW Florida Tag Team Championship. They went on to retain the championship against Dylan Klein and Vance Archer and the team of Curt Hawkins and Heath Slater. At the FCW television tapings on November 19, The Rotundo Brothers lost the championship to The Dude Busters.

On June 2, 2010, he joined NXT under the name Husky Harris, with Cody Rhodes as his WWE Pro. Harris made his televised in ring debut for the show the following week on the June 8 episode of NXT, competing in a tag team match with Rhodes against Montel Vontavious Porter (MVP) and Percy Watson, which they lost. Harris turned heel on the June 22 episode of NXT by attacking announcer Matt Striker, just as Rhodes had done the previous week. The following week on NXT, Harris lost to MVP in a singles match, and was ranked seventh out of the eight rookies in the first poll. In the second poll, Harris moved up to sixth place, narrowly avoiding elimination. On August 9, the rookies appeared in a six-man tag team match on Raw, which Harris' team won when he pinned Kaval, but his team lost a rematch the following night on NXT. In the poll later that night, Harris climbed to fourth place out of the six rookies. Harris was one of two rookies eliminated from NXT on August 17 and, following his elimination, Harris and Rhodes attacked Kaval, resulting in a brawl also involving MVP and Kofi Kingston. Harris reappeared in the season finale of NXT with the other eliminated rookies and joined in on the attack on the NXT winner, Kaval.

While on NXT, Rotunda continued wrestling in FCW while retaining the Husky Harris ring name. In September 2010 following his elimination from NXT, Harris began a feud in FCW with Percy Watson when he attacked Watson while teaming with him in a tag team match, which led to Watson being pinned for the loss. When Harris and Watson faced off in a match, they were both counted out as they brawled out of the arena, which led to a no disqualification match that Harris lost. The feud ended in October, with Harris defeating Watson in a lumberjack match.

The Nexus (2010–2011) 

At the Hell in a Cell pay-per-view on October 4, a disguised Harris and Michael McGillicutty interfered in a match between John Cena and Wade Barrett, and helped Barrett win, forcing Cena to join Barrett's faction The Nexus per the pre-match stipulation. Harris' and McGillicutty's identities were revealed on the following day's episode of Raw, though Barrett claimed he had not asked for their help and refused to make them full-time members of The Nexus. The following week on Raw, Harris and McGillicutty cost Cena a match against The Miz, prompting Barrett to give them the opportunity to win membership in the Nexus. On the October 18 episode of Raw, Harris and McGillicutty failed to earn a place in The Nexus when they lost to Cena and Randy Orton in a tag team match. In spite of their loss, Harris and McGillicutty were inducted into The Nexus on Raw the following week.

In January 2011, CM Punk took over The Nexus and had each of its members put through an initiation. Harris passed his initiation, a lashing from the rest of the group, and was allowed to remain a member of The New Nexus, alongside Punk, McGillicutty and David Otunga. On the January 31 episode of Raw, Harris and McGillicutty unsuccessfully challenged Santino Marella and Vladimir Kozlov for the WWE Tag Team Championship, after which Orton attacked the duo as part of his rivalry with the Nexus and punted Harris in the head, which was used to write Harris off television.

Return to FCW (2011–2012) 
Following the punt by Orton on Raw, Rotunda returned to FCW and in March 2011 adopted the gimmick of the hockey mask-wearing Axl Mulligan, but the character never made it to FCW TV, and Rotunda continued to play the Husky Harris character on FCW TV. In August 2011, Harris became embroiled in his brother Bo's (then FCW Florida Heavyweight Champion) feud with Lucky Cannon and Damien Sandow. The two brothers later teamed up to defeat Cannon and Sandow. Later, Harris voiced his displeasure of Bo's relationship with Aksana, and when Bo suffered a legit injury his title was vacated and a tournament set up to determine the new champion, during which Harris defeated Big E Langston to make it to the final, a fatal four-way match against Dean Ambrose, Leo Kruger and Damien Sandow, which he lost after Richie Steamboat (who was at ringside to aim for Ambrose) performed a superkick on Harris instead. Despite Aksana managing to get Steamboat to attack Harris again, he still won a triple threat match against Ambrose and Sandow to earn a match for the FCW Florida Heavyweight Championship against Kruger, which Harris lost when he was distracted with Steamboat's interference once again. As a result, Harris and Steamboat began feuding, with their first match ending in a no contest. Kruger later defeated the pair in a triple threat match to retain the title. However, Harris defeated Steamboat in a No Holds Barred match. After the pair continued to frequently attack each other, they were suspended for 30 days. Upon their return, Harris defeated Steamboat in a bullrope match to end their feud. On February 2, 2012, Harris and Bo Rotundo defeated Brad Maddox and Eli Cottonwood to win the vacant FCW Florida Tag Team Championship for the second time. They successfully defended the FCW Florida Tag Team Championship against Antonio Cesaro and Alexander Rusev, but lost the championship to Corey Graves and Jake Carter on March 15.

The Wyatt Family (2012–2014) 

In April 2012, Rotunda was repackaged as Bray Wyatt, who initially associated himself with Eli Cottonwood in FCW. When WWE rebranded FCW into NXT Wrestling, Bray Wyatt debuted on the July 11, 2012 episode of the rebooted NXT taped at Full Sail University, where he defeated Aiden English. In July, Wyatt suffered a torn pectoral muscle and required surgery. Despite the injury, Wyatt continued to appear on NXT, founding a faction known as The Wyatt Family in November, with Luke Harper as his first "son" and Erick Rowan as his second. Wyatt had his first match back from injury on the February 21, 2013 episode of NXT, where he defeated Yoshi Tatsu. Wyatt suffered his first loss on the March 13 episode of NXT to Bo Dallas. On the May 2 episode of NXT, Wyatt lost to Chris Jericho. On the May 8 episode of NXT, Harper and Rowan defeated Adrian Neville and Oliver Grey to win the NXT Tag Team Championship. On the July 17 episode of NXT (which was taped on June 20), Harper and Rowan lost the NXT Tag Team Championship to Neville and Corey Graves.

From the May 27 episode of Raw, WWE aired vignettes promoting the upcoming debut of The Wyatt Family. The vignettes showed The Wyatt Family's backwoods origins and Rowan wearing a lamb mask. On the July 8 episode of Raw, The Wyatt Family made their debut by assaulting Kane. The Wyatt Family continued their attacks on wrestlers such as R-Truth, Justin Gabriel, Drew McIntyre, Heath Slater and Jinder Mahal while sending cryptic messages to Kane asking him to "follow the buzzards". Following another assault, Kane challenged Wyatt to his first main roster match, a Ring of Fire match at SummerSlam on August 18, 2013, which he won following interference from Harper and Rowan. After the match, Harper and Rowan again attacked Kane, carrying him away. Wyatt next targeted Kofi Kingston, who he defeated at Battleground on October 6.

Harper and Rowan lost to CM Punk and Daniel Bryan at Survivor Series on November 24. The Wyatt Family defeated Bryan in a handicap match at TLC: Tables, Ladders & Chairs on December 15. On the final Raw of 2013, Bryan defeated Harper and Rowan in a gauntlet match so he could face Wyatt, but they interfered for a disqualification and attacked him until Bryan gave up and joined the group. Wyatt punished Bryan after they failed to find success, leading to Bryan attacking the other members of The Wyatt Family on the January 13 episode of Raw to signal him breaking free of the group. At Royal Rumble on January 26, Wyatt defeated Bryan. Later that night, The Wyatt Family cost John Cena his WWE World Heavyweight Championship match against Randy Orton, with The Wyatt Family attacking Cena afterwards. On the January 27 episode of Raw, The Wyatt Family attacked Bryan, Cena and Sheamus during an Elimination Chamber qualifying match against The Shield, meaning Bryan's team won by disqualification and The Shield lost a chance to enter the Elimination Chamber match. At the event on February 23, The Wyatt Family defeated The Shield. They later interfered in the Elimination Chamber match, which caused Cena to be eliminated.

After Elimination Chamber, Wyatt feuded with Cena, with Wyatt wanting to prove that Cena's heroic act was a facade characteristic of "this era of lies" while also trying to turn Cena into a "monster". Wyatt went on to accept Cena's challenge for a WrestleMania match, with Cena successfully resisting the urge to become a "monster" and overcoming interference from Harper and Rowan to defeat Wyatt at WrestleMania XXX on April 6, marking Wyatt's first pinfall loss on WWE's main roster. The feud continued after WrestleMania XXX based on the story that Wyatt was capturing Cena's fanbase, which was exemplified by Wyatt leading a children's choir to the ring on the April 28 episode of Raw, with the children later putting on sheep masks. At Extreme Rules on May 4, Wyatt defeated Cena in a steel cage match after repeated interference from the rest of The Wyatt Family and a "demonic" child. Cena's feud with Wyatt continued with a Last Man Standing match being set up for Payback on June 1, where Cena buried Wyatt under multiple equipment cases to win the match and end the feud. On the June 13 episode of SmackDown, Wyatt defeated Dean Ambrose to qualify for the 2014 Money in the Bank ladder match for the vacant WWE World Heavyweight Championship on June 29, which Cena won.

The following night on Raw, The Wyatt Family attacked a returning Chris Jericho. This led to matches between Wyatt and Jericho at Battleground on July 20, which Jericho won, and at SummerSlam on August 17, where Wyatt won a rematch despite Harper and Rowan being banned from ringside. The feud with Jericho ended on the September 8 episode of Raw, when Wyatt won a steel cage match by escaping the cage.

The New Face of Fear (2014–2015) 

Beginning on September 29, vignettes were shown of Wyatt "setting Harper and Rowan free". Wyatt returned alone at Hell in a Cell on October 26 during the main event match between Dean Ambrose and Seth Rollins, costing Ambrose the match. In the following weeks, Wyatt taunted Ambrose while offering to "fix" him like he had done with Harper and Rowan. On November 23 at Survivor Series, Wyatt defeated Ambrose by disqualification after Ambrose used a steel chair to attack Wyatt. At TLC: Tables, Ladders & Chairs on December 14, Wyatt defeated Ambrose in a Tables, Ladders and Chairs match. Wyatt once again defeated Ambrose on the December 22 episode of Raw in a Miracle on 34th Street Fight. The feud culminated in an ambulance match on the January 5, 2015 episode of Raw, which Wyatt won to effectively end their feud.

At Royal Rumble on January 25, Wyatt competed in the Royal Rumble match at #5 and lasted for almost 47 minutes, eliminating six other contestants before being eliminated by Big Show and Kane. Following the Royal Rumble, Wyatt began a series of cryptic promos, referring himself as "The New Face of Fear"; at Fastlane on February 22, Wyatt emerged from a casket and challenged The Undertaker for a match at WrestleMania 31 on March 29, which Undertaker accepted, but Wyatt was unsuccessful in defeating The Undertaker. Wyatt defeated Ryback at Payback on May 17.

Return of The Wyatt Family (2015–2017) 
At Money in the Bank on June 14, Wyatt interfered in the Money in the Bank ladder match and attacked Roman Reigns (who had defeated him in a qualification match on Raw) as Reigns was close to retrieving the briefcase. At Battleground on July 19, Wyatt defeated Reigns with the help of former Wyatt Family member Luke Harper, reforming the team (without the injured Erick Rowan who soon returned). At SummerSlam on August 23, Wyatt and Harper lost to Reigns and Ambrose. The following night on Raw, Wyatt introduced a new Wyatt Family member named Braun Strowman, who attacked Ambrose and Reigns. At Night of Champions on September 20, The Wyatt Family defeated Reigns, Ambrose and Jericho. At Hell in a Cell on October 25, Wyatt lost to Reigns in a Hell in a Cell match to end their feud; later that night The Wyatt Family attacked The Undertaker and carried him backstage, reigniting their feud. The next night on Raw, Wyatt was confronted by former rival Kane, who was attacked by the Wyatts and also carried backstage. On the November 9 episode of Raw, The Brothers of Destruction returned and attacked The Wyatt Family. At Survivor Series on November 22, Wyatt and Harper lost to The Brothers of Destruction.

At TLC: Tables, Ladders & Chairs on December 13, The Wyatt Family defeated Team ECW in an eight-man tag team elimination tables match. Wyatt and Luke Harper lost to Brock Lesnar at Roadblock on March 12 in a handicap match. At WrestleMania 32 on April 3, The Wyatt Family confronted The Rock, who defeated Rowan in an impromptu match in six seconds; the Wyatts were fended off by John Cena and The Rock. On the April 4 episode of Raw, The Wyatt Family attacked The League of Nations, starting an unexplained feud between the two factions and showing signs of a face turn. On April 13, during a match against Reigns at a live event in Italy, Wyatt suffered an injury to his right calf and was pulled off WWE's European tour. His injury prematurely ended the feud in the process. The Wyatt Family returned on the June 20 episode of Raw, starting a feud with WWE Tag Team Champions The New Day, who interrupted Wyatt during his return speech, reverting the group back to heels. The New Day later confronted The Wyatt Family at their compound before the Wyatts defeated them at Battleground on July 24 in a six-man tag team match. In the 2016 WWE draft, Wyatt and Rowan were drafted to the SmackDown brand while Strowman was drafted to the Raw brand.

On the August 16 episode of SmackDown, Wyatt walked away from Rowan after he lost his match against Dean Ambrose, leaving Rowan's sheep mask on Wyatt's rocking chair. Wyatt confronted Randy Orton, who he called "damaged" and challenged him to a match at Backlash, which Orton accepted on the August 30 episode of SmackDown. At Backlash on September 11, Wyatt attacked Orton before the match, winning by forfeit. Wyatt then faced Kane in a No Holds Barred match, which he lost when Orton interfered. Orton then challenged Wyatt to another match at No Mercy on October 9, which he accepted and won with the help of the returning Harper. On the October 25 episode of SmackDown, Orton interfered on Wyatt's behalf in his match with Kane and joined The Wyatt Family.

At Survivor Series on November 20, Wyatt and Orton were the sole survivors for Team SmackDown in the traditional 5-on-5 Survivor Series elimination match after Orton saved Wyatt from a spear from Roman Reigns. The pair then began focusing on stopping the momentum of American Alpha, and to a bigger degree capturing the SmackDown Tag Team Championship, defeating them in a match to become #1 contenders. At Tables, Ladders & Chairs on December 4, they won the championship from Heath Slater and Rhyno, marking Wyatt's first title win in WWE. Wyatt and Orton retained the SmackDown Tag Team Championship against the former champions on the December 6 episode of SmackDown but on the December 27 episode, Orton and Luke Harper (who defended the championship under the Freebird Rule) lost the title to American Alpha in a four corners elimination tag team match. This started dissent between Harper and Orton, who faced each other on the January 24, 2017 episode of SmackDown, which Orton won, leading to Wyatt delivering Sister Abigail to Harper, exiling him from the group. On January 29, Wyatt entered the Royal Rumble match at #21 and lasted until the final three: Wyatt and Orton cooperated against Roman Reigns, who eventually eliminated Wyatt but was himself eliminated by Orton, who thereby won the match and a title match at WrestleMania.

On February 12 at Elimination Chamber, Wyatt won the WWE Championship by defeating John Cena, AJ Styles, The Miz, Dean Ambrose, and Baron Corbin in an Elimination Chamber match; it was the first singles title in Wyatt's wrestling career, and the first world title of his career. This raised the possibility of Orton challenging his teammate Wyatt but on the following SmackDown, after Wyatt successfully defended the WWE Championship in a triple threat match involving John Cena and AJ Styles (despite a pre-match attack by Harper), Orton pledged allegiance to Wyatt and refused to face him at WrestleMania 33. However, this was revealed to be a ruse as Orton destroyed The Wyatt Family compound, including Sister Abigail's grave, two weeks later, and defeated Wyatt for the title at WrestleMania 33 on April 2, ending Wyatt's reign at 49 days. On April 10, Wyatt was moved to the Raw brand as a part of the Superstar Shake-up; his title rematch at Payback on April 30, billed as a House of Horrors match, was changed into a non-title match; Wyatt defeated Orton after being helped by Jinder Mahal ending their feud.

Deleters of Worlds (2017–2018) 

At Extreme Rules on June 4, Wyatt failed to become the #1 contender for the Universal Championship in a fatal five-way match won by Samoa Joe. After Seth Rollins was unveiled on the cover of WWE 2K18, Wyatt targeted him and defeated him both at Great Balls of Fire on July 9 and again on the following Raw. Wyatt then began a feud with Finn Bálor, resulting in a match between the two at SummerSlam on August 20, which Bálor won under his "Demon King" persona. Wyatt again lost to Bálor at No Mercy on September 24. They were set to have a third match at TLC: Tables, Ladders & Chairs on October 22, but Wyatt was unable to compete due to an illness concern and was replaced in the match by AJ Styles, bringing the feud between Wyatt and Bàlor to a quiet end. Wyatt returned on the November 13 episode of Raw, facing Jason Jordan in a losing effort.

In November, Wyatt began a feud with Matt Hardy, resulting in Hardy's "Broken" gimmick reemerging. The two fought again at Raw 25 Years on January 22, 2018, which Wyatt won. On January 28, Wyatt entered the Royal Rumble match at #8, but failed to win after Wyatt and Hardy eliminated each other simultaneously. At Elimination Chamber on February 25, Wyatt lost to Hardy. On the March 19 episode of Raw, after losing to Hardy in an Ultimate Deletion match, Wyatt was pushed into the "Lake of Reincarnation", where he disappeared. At WrestleMania 34 on April 8, Wyatt returned and turned face after he interfered in the André the Giant Memorial Battle Royal, helping Hardy win. They formed a team and won the vacant Raw Tag Team Championship on April 27 at Greatest Royal Rumble, defeating Cesaro and Sheamus. They lost the titles to The B-Team (Bo Dallas and Curtis Axel) in their first pay-per-view title defense on July 15 at Extreme Rules. On the July 23 episode of Raw, they invoked their rematch clause against The B-Team, but were unsuccessful. Soon after, Hardy took time off to heal his injuries, disbanding the team. The reason WWE disbanded the team was because they pitched several ideas to WWE to work with their characters.

Firefly Fun House and The Fiend (2019–2021)
In April 2019, ominous vignettes began airing across WWE programming depicting a sinister buzzard puppet, a witch doll, and other toys. Later that month, Wyatt began to appear in pre-recorded segments as the host of a surreal children's program known as Firefly Fun House, sporting different hair and a shorter beard with a leaner physique. The segments featured the aforementioned puppets, called Mercy the Buzzard (a reference to Waylon Mercy, an inspiration for Wyatt's previous gimmick) and Abby the Witch, with Ramblin' Rabbit and Huskus the Pig Boy introduced later (the latter a reference to Wyatt's previous gimmick of Husky Harris), as well as one for Mr. McMahon that occasionally appeared. During the initial segment, Wyatt destroyed a cardboard cutout of his old self with a chainsaw, cheeringly telling viewers all they had to do for him to "light the way" was to "let me in". The Firefly Fun House segments became more sinister, with one featuring Wyatt painting a picture to "express his suppressed feelings", which was a painting of the Wyatt Family compound being burned with Sister Abigail inside—a reference to his WrestleMania 33 feud with Randy Orton. Another featured him having a picnic with expressionless kids, while another revealed that Wyatt was able to control his darkness. He then appeared in more sinister clothing and a demonic mask, a persona he called "The Fiend" that was here "to protect us".

On the July 15 episode of Raw, Wyatt, as The Fiend, attacked previous rival Finn Bálor with a Sister Abigail, re-establishing himself as a heel. At SummerSlam on August 11, The Fiend quickly defeated Bálor. Over the next several weeks, The Fiend attacked several WWE Hall of Famers and legends including Kurt Angle, Jerry Lawler, Kane, and Mick Foley, also adopting Foley's finishing maneuver, The Mandible Claw. The Fiend then began a feud with Universal Champion Seth Rollins by attacking him on September 15 at Clash of Champions. At Hell in a Cell on October 6, they faced each other in a Hell in a Cell match, but the match ended in referee stoppage after The Fiend was buried under several weapons and hit with a sledgehammer by Rollins. Despite the match ending, The Fiend rose as officials checked on him to chase down Rollins and again incapacitate him with the Mandible Claw. The finish was noteworthy for the response from the fans in attendance, who booed loudly and chanted negatively. After he was drafted to the SmackDown brand during the 2019 Draft, The Fiend defeated Rollins on October 31 at Crown Jewel in a falls count anywhere match to win the Universal Championship. The title was subsequently transferred to SmackDown, due to Wyatt being a member of the brand. 

After his title victory, Wyatt introduced two new belt designs; the first one, which his Firefly Fun House character held, was a blue-strapped version to signify its move to SmackDown, while the other was a custom belt for The Fiend. The latter design featured his face in place of the center plate and on a black and red worn leather strap, as well as his phrases "Hurt", "Heal" and "Let [Me] In" on the strap (the word "Me" being represented by The Fiend's face). Wyatt retained the title against Daniel Bryan on November 24 at Survivor Series. After Bryan accepted a rematch on the following SmackDown, The Fiend attacked Bryan and ripped out his hair. With Bryan absent the following week, Wyatt started a short feud with The Miz, culminating in a non-title match at TLC: Tables, Ladders & Chairs on December 15, where Wyatt, wrestling for the first time as his Firefly Fun House character, defeated Miz. After the match, Bryan, with a buzz cut and short beard, made his return and attacked Wyatt. At Royal Rumble on January 26, 2020, The Fiend defeated Bryan in a strap match to end their feud.

On the February 7 episode of SmackDown, Hall of Famer Goldberg challenged The Fiend for the Universal Championship during an onscreen interview, which was scheduled for the Super ShowDown event on February 27, where The Fiend character suffered his first loss to Goldberg, ending his reign at 118 days. The following night on SmackDown, The Fiend confronted a returning John Cena and challenged him to a match at WrestleMania 36 that Cena accepted–a rematch from 2014's WrestleMania XXX. On the second night of the event on April 5, rather than a traditional wrestling match, the two faced off in a surreal trip through history as moments from Wyatt's and Cena's history were played out. The Fiend ultimately defeated Cena in the end, marking Wyatt's first and only WrestleMania victory.

On the April 10 episode of SmackDown, Wyatt challenged new Universal Champion Braun Strowman, who won the title at WrestleMania. A title match was scheduled between the two at Money in the Bank on May 10, which Wyatt (as his Firefly Fun House character) lost. He returned in a Firefly Fun House segment on the June 19 episode of SmackDown to confront Strowman, reintroducing his original "Eater of The Worlds" gimmick and reinstating their rivalry. On July 19 at The Horror Show at Extreme Rules, Wyatt defeated Strowman in a non-title match called the Wyatt Swamp Fight. On the July 31 episode of SmackDown, The Fiend attacked Alexa Bliss, who Strowman had an affection for. Two weeks later, after Strowman attacked Bliss with a gorilla press, The Fiend seemed to have tried to help Bliss, as Strowman appeared and The Fiend were laughing together, confirming their match. At SummerSlam on August 23, The Fiend defeated Strowman to win the Universal Championship for the second time. After the match, they were both attacked by a returning Roman Reigns. At Payback on August 30, The Fiend defended the title against Strowman and Reigns in a triple threat match, which he lost after Reigns pinned Strowman to win the title.

In September, his ring name was officially shortened to The Fiend – indicating a complete transition into what was formerly perceived to be Wyatt's alter ego. The Fiend returned on the October 2 episode of SmackDown and attacked Kevin Owens. After attacking Owens, he extended his hand to Alexa Bliss, which she took and smirked as they disappeared. The Fiend had his first match on SmackDown the following week, defeating Owens. As part of the 2020 Draft in October, The Fiend was drafted to the Raw brand. He soon reignited his old feud with Randy Orton, and at TLC: Tables, Ladders & Chairs on December 20, Orton defeated The Fiend in a Firefly Inferno match before setting his body on fire. At Fastlane on March 21, 2021, The Fiend returned as a tweener, sporting charred skin and singed clothes; he attacked Orton with a Sister Abigail during his intergender match with Alexa Bliss, allowing Bliss to win by pinfall. Another match between The Fiend and Orton was scheduled for WrestleMania 37. On the second night of the event on April 11, The Fiend returned and regenerated back to his pre-burned look; however, Bliss appeared during his match and black liquid began to pour down her face, distracting The Fiend and allowing Orton to win with an RKO. After a brief staredown between The Fiend and Bliss, the lights went out and the pair disappeared. On the following episode of Raw, Bliss declared that she no longer needed him and Wyatt's cheery Firefly Fun House persona returned in a Firefly Fun House segment, stating he was looking forward to a fresh start. This marked Wyatt's final appearance in this stint with WWE, as he was released on July 31.

Return to WWE (2022–present) 
In September 2022, WWE began playing an a cappella version of "White Rabbit" by Jefferson Airplane at live events and during commercial breaks of televised shows, while QR codes were also hidden in various locations on episodes of Raw and SmackDown. Each code led to special websites containing imagery, minigames, and riddles that were all seemingly connected to the upcoming Extreme Rules event on October 8. At the closure of the event, Wyatt returned to WWE, accompanied by live-action versions of his Firefly Fun House characters and a new mask, revealing himself as the person behind the "White Rabbit" teases. On the October 14 episode of SmackDown, Wyatt addressed the crowd until he was interrupted by a video of a masked character. On the October 28 episode, he was again interrupted by the masked character who dubbed himself "Uncle Howdy". On the November 11 episode, Wyatt interrupted LA Knight's backstage interview and attacked him, resulting in a feud between the two. In the coming weeks, the two would confront each other multiple times, including on the December 16 episode of SmackDown, where Uncle Howdy appeared in person and interrupted Knight's in-ring attack on Wyatt. On the December 30 episode of SmackDown, a Pitch Black match between Wyatt and Knight was announced for the Royal Rumble event, which was an anything goes-type match that can only end by pinfall or submission. That same episode, Howdy appeared and attacked Wyatt with a Sister Abigail, confusing Knight. On the January 20, 2023 episode of SmackDown, the Firefly Fun House and its characters returned. At the Royal Rumble, Wyatt defeated Knight; after the match, Uncle Howdy appeared and performed a dive off an elevated platform onto Knight, followed by an explosion.

After the end of his feud with Knight, Wyatt pledged to target whoever won the match between Brock Lesnar and Bobby Lashley at Elimination Chamber, which Lashley won by disqualification when Lesnar hit him with a low blow. On the February 27 episode of Raw, a video reusing Wyatt's "muscle man dance" promo from his Firefly Fun House days taunted Lashley by digitally adding him into the video.

Professional wrestling style, persona, and reception

Character and persona

Wyatt's character from 2013 to 2018 was a villainous cult leader who believed himself to be the "nagging conscience of an immoral world". As the leader of The Wyatt Family, he had main subordinates in Luke Harper and Erick Rowan, as well as Braun Strowman for a brief time. He used a lantern to light the way in the dark arena during entrances, with entrance music by Mark Crozer. He would finish off most of his promos telling opponents and audiences to "follow the buzzards", his signature catchphrase. The character drew comparisons to Robert De Niro's portrayal of the character Max Cady from the 1991 film Cape Fear and fellow wrestler Waylon Mercy. He would use a swinging reverse STO as a finishing move that would be referred to as Sister Abigail.

Following a hiatus from summer 2018 to spring 2019, Wyatt returned with a change in character. He started hosting the "Firefly Fun House" where he would perform as a friendly-mannered children's television show host. Soon after, he debuted a masked alter-ego called The Fiend, who had supernatural characteristics and remembers all the wrongdoings that others had inflicted on Wyatt in the past. During The Fiend's entrance, he carries a severed head resembling Wyatt's old cult leader self with a lantern inside its mouth and uses a heavy metal cover of his old theme music by Code Orange. He also adopted the mandible claw as a finishing move. During in-ring bouts, The Fiend has been presented as having unnatural endurance and strength, being able to withstand multiple finishing moves, weapon attacks and more, before kicking out of pins at a one count. Several of The Fiend's matches have also been done under a red lighting. After returning in 2022, he debuted a new character called Uncle Howdy, based on Richard Kiel's portrayal of Captain Howdy in the 1983 film Hysterical.

Rotunda has been praised for his character work. Readers of the Wrestling Observer Newsletter voted him as the Best Gimmick twice; winning the award in 2013 and 2019.

Criticism of booking
While Rotunda's character work has been widely praised, the in-ring booking of his characters has received criticism. Journalist Dave Meltzer said that although his Fun House/Fiend character was "fantastic" and he is a "genius" as a performer, it doesn't "make his matches great". In particular, his Hell in a Cell match against Seth Rollins at the 2019 Hell in a Cell event was universally panned by fans and critics, due to its "horrid" booking and contentious ending that saw the match being stopped by the referee after Rollins attacked The Fiend with numerous weapons, despite Hell in a Cell matches usually ending via pinfall or submission. Some commentators stated that the match had significantly damaged the character of The Fiend. The match was named Worst Match of the Year by readers of the Wrestling Observer Newsletter. Additionally, various critics have opined out that Wyatt's constant losses were harmful to his character and mystique.

In 2020, readers of the Wrestling Observer Newsletter recognized The Fiend as the Worst Gimmick of the year, making Wyatt the only performer to have won both Best Gimmick and Worst Gimmick.

Personal life 
Rotunda and his ex-wife, Samantha, married in 2012 and had two daughters together before she filed for divorce in 2017. During the divorce proceedings, she demanded that he pay her $15,000 per month in spousal and child support. They were eventually forced into mediation at a family practice in Tampa, Florida. Rotunda and WWE announcer JoJo were revealed to be together during this time, and later had a son named Knash (born May 18, 2019) whose godfather is wrestler Braun Strowman, and a daughter named Hyrie (born May 28, 2020). They became engaged in 2022.

Other media 
Rotunda made his video game debut in WWE '12 (as Husky Harris) and later returned, as Bray Wyatt, in WWE 2K15, WWE 2K16, WWE 2K17, WWE 2K18, and WWE 2K19. His alternate persona The Fiend was a pre-order bonus for WWE 2K20. What is believed to be the current persona of Wyatt is set to be downloadable content in WWE 2K23.

Championships and accomplishments 
 CBS Sports
 Comeback Wrestler of the Year (2019)
 Florida Championship Wrestling
 FCW Florida Tag Team Championship (2 times) – with Bo Rotundo
 Pro Wrestling Illustrated
 Feud of the Year (2010) – 
 Match of the Year (2014) 
 Most Hated Wrestler of the Year (2010) – 
 Ranked No. 6 of the top 500 singles wrestlers in the PWI 500 in 2014
 WrestleCrap
 Gooker Award (2019) 
 Wrestling Observer Newsletter
Best Gimmick (2013) 
Best Gimmick (2019) 
Most Overrated (2020)
 Worst Gimmick (2017) 
Worst Gimmick (2020) 
 Worst Feud of the Year (2017) 
 Worst Feud of the Year (2019) 
 Worst Feud of the Year (2020) 
 Worst Feud of the Year (2021) 
 Worst Worked Match of the Year (2014) 
 Worst Worked Match of the Year (2017) 
 Worst Match of the Year (2019) 
 Worst Match of the Year (2020) 
 WWE 
WWE Championship (1 time) 
 WWE Universal Championship (2 times)
 WWE Raw Tag Team Championship (1 time) – with Matt Hardy
 WWE SmackDown Tag Team Championship (1 time) – with Randy Orton and Luke Harper
Tag Team Eliminator (2018) – with Matt Hardy
WWE Year-End Award for Male Wrestler of the Year (2019)

Notes

References

External links 

 
 
 
 

1987 births
American male professional wrestlers
American professional wrestlers of Italian descent
Living people
People from Brooksville, Florida
Professional wrestlers from Florida
Masked wrestlers
Troy Trojans football players
WWE Champions
WWE Universal Champions
21st-century professional wrestlers
FCW Florida Tag Team Champions